Maxdorf is a Verbandsgemeinde ("collective municipality") in the district Rhein-Pfalz-Kreis, in Rhineland-Palatinate, Germany.

The seat of the Verbandsgemeinde is in Maxdorf.

The Verbandsgemeinde Maxdorf consists of the following Ortsgemeinden ("local municipalities"):

*seat of the Verbandsgemeinde

External links 

 Official Website

Verbandsgemeinde in Rhineland-Palatinate